Atenas Hill Protected Zone, is a protected area in Costa Rica, managed under the Central Conservation Area, it was created in 1976 under executive decree 6112-A.

References 

Nature reserves in Costa Rica
Protected areas established in 1976